Lee Vann Corteza, also spelled Lee Van Corteza, (born 1 March 1979 in Davao City, Philippines) is a Filipino professional pool player. He is nicknamed "Van Van", and started playing pool in 1993.

Early life
Corteza is the oldest of five brothers. His parents named him after American actor Lee Van Cleef. Corteza first took up pool at age thirteen, after a friend brought him to a pool parlor. Corteza was subsequently blacklisted from the parlor after accidentally damaging a table, but he continued to pursue his passion for the game at other parlors.

Career
Corteza has won four gold medals and one silver medal at the Southeast Asian Games, and was the winner of the 2004 WPA Asian Nine-ball Tour tournament in the Philippines, beating fellow countryman Francisco Bustamante 13–11 in the final.

On March 31, 2007, Corteza won the Philippine National Championship by defeating Marlon Manalo with a score of 13–11. Corteza finished runner up in the 2009 WPA World Ten-ball Championship.

In 2017, Corteza defeated Thorsten Hohmann 300–183 to win the Dragon 14.1 Tournament.

Titles and achievements
 2020 Derby City Classic 9-Ball 
 2018 Japan Open 10-Ball
 2017 World Pool Series Kamui Challenge 
 2017 World Pool Series Highrock Challenge
 2017 Dragon 14.1 Tournament
 2017 CSI U.S. Open Straight Pool Championship
 2013 World Cup of Pool - with (Dennis Orcollo)
 2013 China Open 9-Ball Championship
 2013 Southern Classic 9-Ball
 2011 Manny Pacquiao 10-Ball Championship
 2011 San Miguel Beer Oktoberfest 9-Ball Open
 2011 Golden Break 9-Ball Invitational Championship
 2010 CSI U.S. Open 10-ball Championship
 2010 Hard Times 10-Ball Open
 2010 Predator International 10-Ball
2009 Derby City Classic Ten-Ball Challenge
2007 Turning Stone Classic
2007 Philippine National Championship
2006 All Japan Championship 9-Ball
2005 Southeast Asian Games Eight-ball Doubles
2004 San Miguel Asian 9-Ball Tour (Manila Leg)
2003 Southeast Asian Games Eight-ball Singles
2003 Southeast Asian Games Nine-ball Doubles
2001 Southeast Asian Games Eight-Ball Singles
1999 Southeast Asian Games Nine-Ball Singles
1999 Southeast Asian Games Nine-Ball Team

Personal life
Corteza currently resides Astoria, New York.

References

1979 births
Living people
Sportspeople from Davao City
Filipino pool players
Cue sports players at the 2002 Asian Games
Southeast Asian Games gold medalists for the Philippines
Southeast Asian Games competitors for the Philippines
Southeast Asian Games silver medalists for the Philippines
Southeast Asian Games medalists in cue sports
Cue sports players at the 1998 Asian Games
Competitors at the 1999 Southeast Asian Games
Competitors at the 2001 Southeast Asian Games
Competitors at the 2003 Southeast Asian Games
Competitors at the 2005 Southeast Asian Games
Competitors at the 2007 Southeast Asian Games
Asian Games competitors for the Philippines